Orfey, Орфей, is the Bulgarian for Orpheus, a legendary figure in Greek and Trakia mythology, chief among poets and musicians.

Orfey may refer to:
 Orfey class destroyer
 Radio Orfey

See also
 Orpheus (disambiguation), the English and German spelling
 Orphée (disambiguation), the French spelling
 Orfeas (disambiguation), Ορφέας, the Greek spelling
 Orfeo (disambiguation), the Italian spelling
 Orfeu (disambiguation), the Portuguese spelling